Ben Stoyanoff (born 5 January 1995) is a New Zealand cricketer. He made his first-class debut on 8 November 2019, for Central Districts in the 2019–20 Plunket Shield season.

References

External links
 

1995 births
Living people
New Zealand cricketers
Central Districts cricketers
Place of birth missing (living people)